Red Light Radio was an online radio station and international music
platform based in Amsterdam’s Red Light District. From 2010 to 2020 Red Light
Radio broadcast daily shows of local and international artists, and was involved with
parties & concerts and collaborations with festivals, museums & other
cultural partners all over the world.

The main goal of the station was to spread underground
music gems. The station broadcast approximately 40 different live
shows every week. These were streamed live and then available on demand
on the website and RLR Mixcloud/Soundcloud pages. Through the years RLR built a
global community with music lovers and fans.

RLR ended its daily radio shows in mid-2020, saying it had "always been aware" its Oudekerksplein location was temporary, but Covid lockdowns had "accelerated the inevitable goodbye."

Location 
The location of the radio studio was in a former brothel in the heart
of Amsterdam's Red Light District. They shared the building with many
Amsterdam creatives and the record stores Red Light Records & Vintage
Voudou. The radio studio was right behind a window between the
prostitutes at the Oudekerksplein, next to Amsterdam's oldest
building, the Oude Kerk.

Red Light Radio also travelled with a mobile studio to broadcast
from different locations. There were dozens of collaborations
with cultural partners and events. There were live broadcasts
from parties, museums, festivals and other spaces. Next to Holland,
the station visited China, Russia, USA, Switzerland, Germany,
France, Italy, Spain, Sweden & Turkey for several radio broadcasts and
events.

Guests 
Over the years Red Light Radio had many international guests at their
station including live sessions & DJ-sets by Allah-Las, Andrew WK,
Charanjit Singh, Chelsea Wolfe, Connan Mockasin, Death, Dirty Fences,
Homeboy Sandman, J Mascis, Joey Anderson, John Cooper Clarke,
Jonwayne, Joy Orbison, Mac DeMarco, Marcellus Pittman, Max D, Wooden Shjips, Nisennenmondai, NOFX, Nothing, Optimo, Peaking Lights, Randomer,
Ron Morelli, Seth Troxler, Shabazz Palaces, Silent Servant, Solar,
Suuns, Suzanne Kraft, The Gaslamp Killer, The Shrine, The Soft Moon,
Traxx, Vakula, Veronica Vasicka, Viet Cong & Wooden Wisdom.

Awards 
In 2015 Red Light Radio won Mixcloud's Best Online Radio Station award
and visited the International Radio Festival in Zürich in August 2015.

References

External links
 

Defunct radio stations in the Netherlands
Radio stations established in 2010
Radio stations disestablished in 2020